Ian Calman Muir MacLennan is Emeritus Professor of Immunology at the University of Birmingham MRC Centre for Immune Regulation in Birmingham, UK.

He was born on 30 December 1939. He has made pioneering contributions to immunology and was the first to discover marginal zone B-cells.

He was made a Commander of the Order of the British Empire in the Queen's Birthday Honours in 2005. He was elected a Fellow of the Royal Society (FRS) in 2012, his nomination reads:

References

British immunologists
Fellows of the Royal Society
Living people
Academics of the University of Birmingham
1939 births